The J.League Best Young Player (formerly known as the "J.League Rookie of the Year" from 1993 to 2019) is awarded by the J.League to the most outstanding rookie of the season.  To be considered a rookie, a player must be in his first professional year of football (domestically or abroad).

Players names shown in bold were also named in the best eleven for that season.

Wins By Club

See also
J.League awards

References

 ULTRAZONE Website : All-Time Award Winners 

J.League trophies and awards
Rookie of the Year
Annual events in Japan
Association football player non-biographical articles
Association football young player of the year awards
Rookie player awards